John E. Pearce Provincial Park has been a protected area since 1957. It is located in the Carolinian forest zone of southwestern Ontario, covers 67.9 hectares on the north shore of Lake Erie in Elgin County, and is one of two protected areas in the Southwest Elgin Forest Complex subzone.

The land was a farmstead with cultivated fields and a woodlot enclosing a gullied area. The soils are complex associations of lacustrine material ranging in texture from clay to loamy fine sand and overlie fine-textured till which is exposed in gullies. Sugar maple dominates the woodlot which is lent exceptional diversity by the frequent presence of American beech, ironwood, plus species of hickory, ash and walnut and many herbaceous species. Also present are tulip tree and sassafras.

References

External links

Important Bird Areas of Ontario
Provincial parks of Ontario
Temperate broadleaf and mixed forests in Canada
Forests of Ontario
1957 establishments in Ontario
Protected areas established in 1957